Breet is a surname. Notable people with the surname include:

JJ Breet (born 1991), South African rugby union player
Vincent Breet (born 1993), South African competitive rower